Panthiades paphlagon is a butterfly in the family Lycaenidae. It was described by Cajetan Felder and Rudolf Felder in 1865. It is found in Colombia, Peru and Venezuela.

References

Butterflies described in 1865
Eumaeini
Lycaenidae of South America
Taxa named by Baron Cajetan von Felder
Taxa named by Rudolf Felder